Brass fasteners are widely used in many industries due to their mechanical strength and corrosion resistance. The composition of brass mainly consists of copper, with a small addition of zinc and sometimes other metals, typically tin, lead or aluminium. Brass has higher malleability in comparison to that zinc or copper. This combination creates a strong alloy that proves up to 40% superior to pure copper in terms of yielding strength, ultimate tensile strength and shear strength. The copper content varies depending on the desired colour of the final product; higher copper content will darken the brass hue, while lower copper content results in a light yellow or golden tone. The machinability of brass increases with an increase in lead content. In short, brass fasteners offer superior performance compared to other metal alloys since they are easy to machine and form with low frictional characteristics while still being able to resist corrosion over time.

Brass fasteners are a popular choice for applications ranging from residential to industrial and from automotive uses to marine settings. Aside from being durable, brass fasteners offer solid electrical and thermal conductivity, making them appropriate for use with wires and other electrically charged items. These fasteners also show strong corrosion resistance in most environmental conditions and in bio-fouling, plus they offer good workability when forming or machining products with finer details or edges. Additionally, brass materials feature an appealing aesthetic quality which is often needed in visible applications like locks, gears, doors, valves, and knobs. When considering the ultimate costs of any project, many use brass fasteners as an economical option. Brass fasteners are commercially available in forms like bolts, U-bolts, J-bolts, Screws, Nuts, Hex Nuts and Washers. Brass comes in different types. DZR is one type of brass that is known for its high resistance to corrosion.

References

External links
Paper Fasteners
Brass Fasteners

Fasteners
Stationery
Office equipment
Metallic objects